Eduardo Maggiolo (born 2 August 1944) is a retired Argentine wrestler who won a bronze medal in the 57 kg freestyle category at the 1971 Pan American Games. He competed in freestyle and Greco-Roman wrestling at the 1972 Summer Olympics, but was eliminated in the fourth and second bout, respectively.

References

External links
 

1944 births
Living people
Olympic wrestlers of Argentina
Wrestlers at the 1972 Summer Olympics
Argentine male sport wrestlers
Pan American Games bronze medalists for Argentina
Pan American Games medalists in wrestling
Wrestlers at the 1971 Pan American Games
Medalists at the 1971 Pan American Games
20th-century Argentine people
21st-century Argentine people